Universal Sports Palace Molot is an indoor sporting arena that is located in Perm, Russia.  It has a seating capacity of 7,000 spectators for basketball, and 6,000 spectators for ice hockey.

History
Universal Sports Palace Molot was originally built in 1966, and it was reconstructed in 1989. It is the home arena of the Molot-Prikamye Perm ice hockey team, and was also the home of the Ural Great basketball team. Parma Basket basketball team also uses the arena.

External links
Sports Palace Molot on Ural Great Official site

Indoor ice hockey venues in Russia
Sport in Perm, Russia
Indoor arenas built in the Soviet Union
Indoor arenas in Russia
Basketball venues in Russia
Buildings and structures in Perm Krai